Román González may refer to:

Román González (basketball) (born 1978), Argentine basketball player
Román González (boxer) (born 1987), Nicaraguan boxer